Deja Kelly (born September 8, 2001) is an American college basketball player for the North Carolina Tar Heels of the Atlantic Coast Conference (ACC). She was a first-team All-ACC selection as a sophomore. Kelly graduated from Duncanville High School in Duncanville, Texas, where she was a McDonald's All-American.

Early life and high school career
Kelly developed an interest in basketball at age five, playing on courts in San Antonio, Texas. She trained under the guidance of her mother, Theresa Nunn, who also coached her on the Amateur Athletic Union circuit. Kelly drew inspiration from Skylar Diggins-Smith. She began playing varsity basketball as a freshman at Lady Bird Johnson High School in San Antonio. In her first year with the team, Kelly averaged 19.2 points, 3.4 steals and 3.1 assists per game and was named San Antonio Express-News Newcomer of the Year. As a sophomore, she averaged 27.7 points and 7.6 rebounds per game, making the San Antonio Express-News Super Team. 

Kelly transferred to Duncanville High School in Duncanville, Texas for her junior season. She hoped to gain more national attention by playing at a larger school. Kelly averaged 16 points per game as a junior. She was named District 8-6A Offensive MVP and received SportsDayHS All-Area third team honors from the The Dallas Morning News. In her senior season, Kelly averaged 23.5 points, 4.9 rebounds, 2.6 assists and 3.7 steals per game, leading Duncanville to the Class 6A state championship. She earned SportsDayHS Player of the Year and Texas Gatorade Player of the Year recognition. Kelly was selected to play in the McDonald's All-American Game and Jordan Brand Classic, which were canceled due to the COVID-19 pandemic.

Recruiting
Kelly was considered a five-star recruit and the number 10 player in the 2020 class by ESPN. In seventh grade, she committed to play college basketball for Texas, her father's alma mater, before reopening her recruitment four years later. On November 18, 2019, Kelly committed to North Carolina over offers from Texas A&M, Duke and Minnesota.

College career
On November 25, 2020, Kelly made her debut for North Carolina, recording 19 points, four rebounds and three assists in a 90–61 win over Radford. On December 17, she posted a season-high 22 points, eight assists and five rebounds in a 92–68 victory against AP No. 18 Syracuse. She matched her season-high in points twice in consecutive wins over Georgia Tech and Virginia Tech in February 2021. As a freshman, Kelly averaged 11 points, 2.9 assists and 2.3 rebounds per game, shooting 32.9 percent from the field. She was a two-time Atlantic Coast Conference (ACC) Freshman of the Week selection and made the ACC All-Freshman Team.

As a sophomore, Kelly had a career-high 31 points along with four rebounds and four assists in a 81–62 win against Clemson on January 2, 2022. One week later, she recorded her first double-double with 15 points and 10 rebounds in a 71–46 win over Virginia Tech. At the 2022 NCAA tournament, Kelly helped North Carolina make its first Sweet 16 appearance in seven years. She averaged 16.5 points, 3.6 rebounds and 2.6 assists per game and shot 85.8 percent from the free throw line, which led the ACC. Kelly earned first-team All-ACC accolades and received Women's Basketball Coaches Association (WBCA) All-American honorable mention.

In her junior season, Kelly cemented herself as one of the top women's basketball players in the ACC. Once again earning first-team all-ACC honors, Kelly started every game in which she played, despite missing one contest due to injury. She set a new career high with 32 points in a 75–67 loss against Syracuse, and on the season led the team in points and assists, averaging 16.3 points and 3.2 assists per game.

Statistics

|-
| style="text-align:left;"| 2020–21
| style="text-align:left;"| North Carolina
| 24 || 22 || 28.8 || .329 || .307 || .810 || 2.3 || 2.9 || .8 || 0 || 11.0
|-
| style="text-align:left;"| 2021–22
| style="text-align:left;"| North Carolina
| 32 || 32 || 30.7 || .366 || .361 || .858 || 3.6 || 2.6 || 1.4 || .2 || 16.5
|-
| style="text-align:left;"| 2023–23
| style="text-align:left;"| North Carolina
| 31 || 31 || 35.4 || .372 || .282 || .714 || 3.8 || 3.2 || 1.2 || .1 || 16.3
|- class="sortbottom"
| style="text-align:center;" colspan="2"| Career
|| 87 || 85 || 31.8 || .361 || .322 || .786 || 3.3 || 2.9 || 1.1 || .1 || 14.9

Personal life
Kelly's mother, Theresa Nunn, played basketball at Valley City State University and raised her as a single parent. Her father, Darren Kelly, played college basketball for Texas from 1999 to 2001 and was an All-Big 12 selection. 

Kelly has signed name, image and likeness (NIL) deals with Beats Electronics, Dunkin' Donuts, Forever 21 and Outback Steakhouse, among other companies. She has equity in the hydration company Drink Barcode as part of an NIL deal.

At the University of North Carolina at Chapel Hill, Kelly majors in broadcast journalism and aspires to become a sports broadcaster after her playing career. She has served as an anchor for Sports Xtra, a student-run show at the UNC Hussman School of Journalism and Media.

References

External links
North Carolina Tar Heels bio

2001 births
Living people
American women's basketball players
Basketball players from San Antonio
Point guards
North Carolina Tar Heels women's basketball players
Duncanville High School alumni
McDonald's High School All-Americans